The Kingmaking is the first in the Pendragon's Banner trilogy of Arthurian novels by the British writer Helen Hollick. It was published in 1994 by William Heinemann in the United Kingdom. It was followed by Pendragon's Banner and Shadow of the King.

The semi-historical novel follows the rise of the young Arthur Pendragon after the death of his father, Uther. The book concentrates on Arthur's relationship with Gwenhwyfar and his emerging prowess on the battlefield. The Kingmaking is set in Britain during the late fifth century some sixty years after the Roman legions pulled out of the island. By putting King Arthur into a realistic historical setting, some characters from Arthurian legend such as Merlin and Lancelot are left out.

Sharon Penman called the novel "a wonderful book [...] [that] breathes new life into an ancient legend." Books called the novel "A uniquely compelling novel which is bound to have a resounding and lasting impact on Arthurian fiction."

References

External links
 review of Hollick's Arthurian trilogy
 Authors official site

1994 novels
Historical novels
Modern Arthurian fiction